The Tracy–Widom distribution is a probability distribution from random matrix theory introduced by . It is the distribution of the normalized largest eigenvalue of a random Hermitian matrix. The distribution is defined as a Fredholm determinant.

In practical terms, Tracy–Widom is the crossover function between the two phases of weakly versus strongly coupled components in a system.
It also appears in the distribution of the length of the longest increasing subsequence of random permutations, as large-scale statistics in the Kardar-Parisi-Zhang equation, in current fluctuations of the asymmetric simple exclusion process (ASEP) with step initial condition, and in simplified mathematical models of the behavior of the longest common subsequence problem on random inputs.

The distribution F1 is of particular interest in multivariate statistics. For a discussion of the universality of Fβ, β = 1, 2, and 4, see . For an application of F1 to inferring population structure from genetic data see .
In 2017 it was proved that the distribution F is not infinitely divisible.

Definition
The Tracy–Widom distribution is defined as the limit:

where  denotes the largest eigenvalue of the random matrix.

Equivalent formulations
The cumulative distribution function of the Tracy–Widom distribution can be given as the Fredholm determinant

of the operator As on square integrable functions on the half line (s, ∞) with kernel given in terms of Airy functions Ai by

It can also be given as an integral

in terms of a solution of a Painlevé equation of type II

where q, called the Hastings–McLeod solution, satisfies the boundary condition

Other Tracy–Widom distributions
The distribution F2 is associated to unitary ensembles in random matrix theory.  There are analogous Tracy–Widom distributions F1 and F4 for orthogonal (β = 1) and symplectic ensembles (β = 4) that are also expressible in terms of the same Painlevé transcendent q:

and

Numerical approximations

Numerical techniques for obtaining numerical solutions to the Painlevé equations of the types II and V, and numerically evaluating eigenvalue distributions of random matrices in the beta-ensembles were first presented by  using MATLAB. These algorithms can be used to compute numerically the mean, variance, skewness and excess kurtosis of the distributions Fβ. 
   

For a simple approximation based on a shifted gamma distribution see .

 developed a spectral algorithm for the eigendecomposition of the integral operator , which can be used to rapidly evaluate Tracy–Widom distributions, or, more generally, the distributions of the kth largest level at the soft edge scaling limit of Gaussian ensembles, to machine accuracy.

See also 
 Wigner semicircle distribution
 Marchenko–Pastur distribution

Footnotes

References
.
.
.

.
.
.
.
.
.
.
.
.
.
.
.

.
.

.
.

Further reading
.
.
.
.

External links
.
.
.
At the Far Ends of a New Universal Law, Quanta Magazine

Continuous distributions
Random matrices
Special functions